This is a list of LazyTown DVDs that have been released. So far, discs have been released in the United States, the United Kingdom, Germany, Iceland, Denmark, Finland, Norway, Sweden, Spain, and Australia.

For a list of episodes that have aired in English, see List of LazyTown episodes.

Region 1

North America
Eight DVDs have been released for retail in North America, as of October 30, 2012. The volumes from 2005 and 2006 were released by Paramount Home Media Distribution for Nick Jr. and the volumes from 2012 were released by NCircle Entertainment. In addition, a promotional sampler disc was released to Kmart stores in 2005. All discs feature Dolby Digital 2.0 audio and a 1.33:1 aspect ratio.

Episodes on Nick Jr. compilation DVDs

Region 2

United Kingdom
Eleven DVDs have been released in the U.K. as of May 23, 2011, containing a total of 50 unique episodes (4 episodes appear on more than one disc). These DVDs have four to six episodes each, unlike the standard four episodes for other regions. They also use the British-accent voice dubs, are in widescreen format, and feature subtitles and menus that are more interactive than in other regions.

Note: 9 Lazytown DVD Release By BBC 

1.Welcome to Lazytown 

2.Surprise Santa 

3.Anyone Can Be a Hero 

4.No One's Lazy in Lazytown 

5.Go Go Lazytown 

6.Once Upon a Time in Lazytown 

7.Snow Monster 

8.Sportacus on the Move 

9.Football Crazy

1 Last and Final Lazytown DVD By 2lEntertain/BBC 

10.There's Always a Way

Germany
Thirteen DVDs have been released in Germany as of November 7, 2008, containing a total of 52 episodes and one bonus music video. They are all in fullscreen and feature a single audio track in German.

Denmark
Ten DVDs have been released in Denmark as of March 6, 2007, containing a total of 34 episodes. They are all in Widescreen. All the Scandinavian DVDs feature four audio tracks: Danish, Finnish, Norwegian, and Swedish.

Finland
Ten DVDs have been released in Finland as of March 14, 2007, containing a total of 34 episodes. They are all in Widescreen. All the Scandinavian DVDs feature four audio tracks: Danish, Finnish, Norwegian, and Swedish.

Norway
Ten DVDs have been released in Norway as of December 6, 2006, containing a total of 34 episodes. They are all in Widescreen. All the Scandinavian DVDs feature four audio tracks: Danish, Finnish, Norwegian, and Swedish.

Sweden
Fifteen DVDs have been released in Sweden as of October 1, 2013, containing a total of all 52 episodes. They are all in Widescreen. All the Scandinavian DVDs feature four audio tracks: Danish, Finnish, Norwegian, and Swedish.

Spain
A box set of the first season of LazyTown, three episodes per disc, has been released in Spain. The DVDs are fullscreen format.

Region 4

Australia
Sixteen DVDs have been released in Australia as of April 2014, containing a total of 64 episodes including the new season 3 episodes. In 2013 Australia was the first country to have episode from series 3 released on DVD. In widescreen format, they feature the original (undubbed) English soundtrack and descriptive English subtitles for the hearing impaired. It could be possible for Australia to release the first DVDs for season 4.

Region 0

Slovenia
Nine DVDs were released in Slovenia in 2011, containing a total of 35 episodes. They are presented in widescreen format and feature only the Slovenian dub audio track. Each disc also includes karaoke clips as a bonus.

References

LazyTown